Yuchengia is a fungal genus in the family Polyporaceae. It is a monotypic genus, containing the single species Yuchengia narymica, a crust fungus formerly placed in the genus Perenniporia and originally described as Trametes narymica by Czech mycologist Albert Pilát.

Description
Yuchengia narymica has a cream to yellowish buff pore surface with angular pores. The hyphal system is dimitic (containing both generative and skeletal hyphae), and the generative hyphae have clamp connections. Similar to Perenniporia, Yuchengia has thick-walled and cyanophilous spores. Yuchengia is distinguished from Perenniporia in its acyanophilous and amyloid skeletal hyphae that dissolve in KOH, and non-dextrinoid spores.

References

Fungi of Europe
Fungi of North America
Polyporaceae
Monotypic Polyporales genera
Taxa described in 2013
Taxa named by Bao-Kai Cui